Komaripalem is a village in Biccavolu mandal of East Godavari district in the state of Andhra Pradesh in India.

Geography
Komaripalem is located in Biccavolu Mandal, East Godavari District. It has an average elevation of 13 meters (42.65 feet).

It is famous for making of firecrackers, especially hand-made rockets, and flower pots.

History
Long ago there was an ancient town named Gowripatnam padu. It was a big town in Rajamahendravaram kingdom. It often suffered from natural disasters like earthquakes and droughts. The people made a number of big ponds to store water. At the last stage of township the people had nothing to eat. They tried to eat even soil to control their hunger. They felt that it was very hard to stay there, and decided to shift from the town. The people went in different directions and made small villages as per their requirements and comfort. Many people who had great affection for the town settled very nearby and made a village. They felt this new village was a son of the old town. As per Hindu stories, Kumaraswamy is the only natural born son of Gowri devi. Therefore, they put the village name as "Kumarapalem". With time passing and different pronunciations the name gradually changed to Komaripalem.

Everywhere one can find a village goddess in or near the village. However, Komaripalem people still give priority to the Gowripatnampadu town goddess Gogulamma, located 5 km from the village. They also offer pujas to the village goddess Dosalamma. One can still find three very small ponds near Gogulamma temple named Enugula Cheruvu, Kanikela Cheruvu, etc.  One can also find some big rocks which were used as temple bricks.

Present
Komaripalem is well known for fire crackers, super markets and rice mills. "Sri Mahalakshmi super Bazar" is the biggest super market located at Y-Junction Komaripalem village. There are more than 10 Rice mill industries in and around Komaripalem Village. "Murali Mohana Rice mill" which makes rice bags under famous brand name "Sri Bell" is also Located in komaripalem. R.K. Restaurant is famous for chicken biryani.

Political arena
 Total wards: 14
 Total Mptc: 2
 Ex-president: Padala Venkata Rama Reddy S/o Padala Ammi Reddy garu (ex mla)
Ex-vice president: Dwarampudi venkata Reddy S/o Dwarampudi venkata reddy
Ex-president:  Kovvuri Jyothirmai Sathya Narayana Reddy. D/o- Tadi Aravindam

Population
 Population: 6434
 Male: 3211
 Female: 3223
 Voters: 4500+

Temples
 Dosallama Temple
 Durgamma Temple
 Gowreeswara Swami Temple
 Ramalayam-6
 Subrahmanyeswara Swamy Temple
 Venu Gopala Swami Temple
 Gogulamma Temple

Banks
 HDFC Bank
 Vijaya Bank
. Godavari Grameena Bank

References 

Villages in East Godavari district